

Men's winners 

{| class="sortable wikitable"
! Year !! Winner
|-
| 1942 || José Andrés Pérez
|-
| 1943 || José Andrés Pérez
|-
| 1947 || Felipe Pinzón Sánchez
|-
| 1949 || Julio Súmar Casis
|-
| 1950 || Felipe Pinzón Sánchez
|-
| 1951 || Felipe Pinzón Sánchez
|-
| 1952 || Felipe Pinzón Sánchez
|-
| 1953 || José Andrés Pérez
|-
| 1955 || José Andrés Pérez
|-
| 1957 || Néstor Del Pozo
|-
| 1960 || Mario La Torre
|-
| 1961 || Oscar Quiñones
|-
| 1962 || Carlos Espinoza Rivasplata
|-
| 1963 || Oscar Quiñones
|-
| 1964 || Oscar Quiñones
|-
| 1966 || Oscar Quiñones
|-
| 1967 || Julio Súmar Casis
|-
| 1968 || Orestes Rodríguez Vargas
|-
| 1969 || Orestes Rodríguez Vargas
|-
| 1970 || Orestes Rodríguez Vargas
|-
| 1971 || Orestes Rodríguez Vargas
|-
| 1972 || Orestes Rodríguez Vargas
|-
| 1973 || Guillermo Ruiz
|-
| 1974 || Carlos Pesantes Carbajal
|-
| 1975 || Héctor Bravo Sedamanos
|-
| 1976 || Héctor Bravo Sedamanos
|-
| 1978 || Manuel Gonzales Bernal
|-
| 1979 || Carlo Robbiano Piura
|-
| 1980 || Pedro García Toledo
|-
| 1981 || Víctor Vílchez Talavera
|-
| 1982 || Jorge Peláez Conti
|-
| 1984 || Manuel Gonzales Bernal
|-
| 1985 || Juan Reyes Larenas 
|-
| 1986 || Javier García Toledo 
|-
| 1987 || Henry Urday Cáceres
|-
| 1988 || Jorge Pacheco Asmat 
|-
| 1989 || Marcos Osorio
|-
| 1990 || Carlo Robbiano Piura
|-
| 1993 || Jorge Pacheco Asmat
|-
| 1994 || Julio Granda Zúñiga
|-
| 1995 || Julio Granda Zúñiga
|-
| 1996 || Julio Granda Zúñiga
|-
| 1997 || Julio Granda Zúñiga
|-
| 1998 || Mario Belli Pino
|-
| 1999 || Henry Urday Cáceres
|-
| 2000 || Filemón Cruz Lima
|-
| 2001 || Carlomagno Oblitas Guerrero
|-
| 2002 || Julio Granda Zúñiga
|-
| 2003 || Carlomagno Oblitas Guerrero
|-
| 2004 || Carlomagno Oblitas Guerrero
|-
| 2005 || Emilio Córdova
|-
| 2006 || Jorge Cori
|-
| 2007 || Ernesto Ramos
|-
| 2008 || Renato Alfredo Terry Luján
|-
| 2009 || Efrain Palacios
|-
| 2010 || Efrain Palacios
|-
| 2011 || Efrain Palacios
|-
| 2012 || Giuseppe Leiva
|-
| 2013 || Elfer Cutipa
|-
| 2015 || Renato Alfredo Terry Luján
|-
| 2016 || Fernando Fernández Sánchez
|-
| 2017 || Giuseppe Leiva

|}

Women

{| class="sortable wikitable"
! Year !! Winner
|-
| 1997 || Silvana Pacheco Gallardo
|-
| 2000 || Karen Zapata
|-
| 2002 || Karen Zapata
|-
| 2003 || Karen Zapata
|-
| 2004 || Karen Zapata
|-
| 2007 || Ingrid Aliaga
|-
| 2008 || Ann Chumpitaz
|-
| 2009 || Ingrid Aliaga
|-
| 2010 || Ann Chumpitaz
|-
| 2011 || Ingrid Aliaga
|-
| 2012 || Ingrid Aliaga
|-
| 2013 || Nicole Valdivia Cano
|-
| 2015 || Mitzy Caballero
|-
| 2016 || Ingrid Aliaga
|-
| 2017 || Ingrid Aliaga
|}

References

External links
 Campeonato de Perú
 Mayores Absoluto

Chess national championships
Women's chess national championships
Chess in Peru